Cameron Woki (born 7 November 1998) is a French rugby union player. His position is either  lock or as a flanker. He currently plays for Racing 92 in the Top 14 and the France national team.

International career

International tries

Honours

France
 Six Nations Championship: 2022

France U20
World Rugby Under 20 Championship: 2018
Six Nations Under 20s Championship: 2018

References

External links
Cameron Woki at France Rugby
Cameron Woki at Racing 92
Cameron Woki at All.Rugby

1998 births
Sportspeople from Saint-Denis, Seine-Saint-Denis
Living people
French rugby union players
Union Bordeaux Bègles players
Racing 92 players
France international rugby union players
Rugby union flankers